Destin Executive Airport , also known as Coleman Kelly Field, is a public use airport owned by and located in Okaloosa County, Florida. The airport is one nautical mile (2 km) east of the central business district of Destin, Florida. It is included in the National Plan of Integrated Airport Systems for 2021–2025, which categorized it as a general aviation facility.

Although many U.S. airports use the same three-letter location identifier for the FAA and IATA, this airport is assigned DTS by the FAA and DSI by the IATA.  The airport's ICAO identifier is KDTS. Due to its close proximity to Eglin Air Force Base and the high levels of military flight activity, all flights to or from Destin Executive Airport must adhere to "special air traffic rules" and obtain ATC clearance before entering the Eglin/Valparaiso terminal area. The Destin Executive Airport is an independent general flight office possessed and worked by Okaloosa Area, and is not reliant on ad valorem charges.

History 
The first landing at the airport occurred on October 13, 1961. Lucius Burch of Memphis, Tennessee, and two passengers came for a weekend of fishing. Formerly, he had to land in Crestview, Florida, which Burch described as a "terrible nuisance". The field was being clayed by the county at the request of the Okaloosa Airport and Industrial Authority.

Frank D. Duckett of Shalimar, Florida, announced that he had opened the area's first air charter service at a Playground Chamber of Commerce meeting on Dec. 8, 1961. Duckett said that the 2,000-foot runway in Destin was being hard surfaced, lights were being installed and that fuel and maintenance service would be available. He was arranging for rental cars to be parked at the airport for incoming planes. The service offered a Tri-Pacer 135, four seat aircraft, with other types of aircraft available based on the customer's needs. Duckett said that the rates for the Tri-Pacer would be 5.5 cents per mile, per person, based on a full load of four persons.

Facilities and aircraft 
Destin Executive Airport covers an area of 395 acres (160 ha) at an elevation of 22 feet (7 m) above mean sea level.

For the 12-month period ending December 31, 2018, the airport had 63,987 aircraft operations, an average of 175 per day: 99% general aviation, 1% air taxi and less than 1% military.
In April 2022, there were 61 aircraft based at this airport: 31 single-engine, 14 multi-engine, 11 jet and 5 helicopter.

Airlines and destinations 

Airlines offering scheduled passenger service to non-stop destinations:

Accidents and incidents 
The first fatal aircraft accident recorded at the Destin Executive Airport occurred on February 16, 1975, when a Cessna 210 with three people on board crashed shortly after a 0100 hrs. (1AM, local standard time) departure from the facility, the single-engined propeller cabin monoplane coming down one quarter mile from the runway in an area platted for the future Kelly Estates subdivision. All three were killed, the airframe burning completely with bodies burnt beyond recognition. Officials said that the plane was flying under a 200-foot ceiling with poor visibility. No flight plan had been filed. An investigator of the Federal Aviation Administration stated that there was no immediate evidence of mechanical failure.

On April 17, 1983, a Beechcraft Bonanza clipped power lines and crashed south of the airport and knocked out power to most of Destin for hours. The pilot and passenger survived.

On  December 24, 1987, a Cessna 150 attempting a landing at Destin Executive Airport was caught by the sudden onset of fog as it circled to land which cut visibility to nothing. The plane struck the 19th floor of the Hidden Dunes Resort, becoming lodged in the wall of unit 1901 by the fuselage and landing gear. The 39-year old pilot was seriously injured and his 31-year-old female passenger died on site from injuries from the impact. There was no fire. The pilot was pulled into the building through a window on the 18th floor. "A National Transportation Safety Board investigation later found [the pilot] to be at fault for the crash, having planned poorly by not accounting for the fog that was in the area and not being rated to fly in conditions that required instruments to navigate."

See also 
 Destin-Fort Walton Beach Airport (VPS) located within Eglin Air Force Base

References

External links 

 Destin Airport / Coleman Kelly Field, official site
 Miracle Strip Aviation and Destin Jet, the fixed-base operators (FBOs)
 Aerial image as of January 1999 from USGS The National Map

Airports in Florida
Transportation buildings and structures in Okaloosa County, Florida
1961 establishments in Florida